Baniapur Assembly constituency is an assembly constituency in Saran district in the Indian state of Bihar.

Overview
As per Delimitation of Parliamentary and Assembly constituencies Order, 2008, No. 115 Baniapur Assembly constituency is composed of the following: Baniapur (except Karhi, Manikpura and Lauwa Kala gram panchayats) and Mashrakh community development blocks.

Baniapur Assembly constituency is part of No. 19 Maharajganj (Lok Sabha constituency).

Members of Legislative Assembly

Election results

2020 

In the 2020 Bihar Legislative Assembly election once again Kedar Nath Singh won the election from RJD ticket.

in the 2015 Bihar Legislative Assembly election Kedar Nath Singh won this seat the second time.

In the 2010 state assembly elections, Kedar Nath Singh of RJD won the Baniapur assembly seat defeating his nearest rival Virendra Kumar Ojha of JD(U). Contests in most years were multi cornered but only winners and runners up are being mentioned. Manoranjan Singh of representing JD(U) defeated Uma Pandey of Congress in October 2005.  Manoranjan Singh of representing Lok Janshakti Party/ Independent defeated Ram Bahadur Rai of RJD in February 2005 and 2000. Ram Bahadur Rai of JD/ Janata Party (JP) defeated Uma Pandey of Congress in 1995 and 1990. Uma Pandey of Congress defeated Ram Bahadur Rai, Independent, in 1985 and Rama Kant Pandey of BJP in 1980. Rama Kant Pandey of JP defeated Uma Pandey of Congress in 1977.

References

External links
 

Assembly constituencies of Bihar
Politics of Saran district